Mandelli Sistemi S.p.A. was established in 1932 in Piacenza, founded by Renato Mandelli. The corporate form of the foundation is an Individual Company, designed for the precision machining of mechanical parts.

History

The first evolution 
Mandelli Sistemi grows and over time becomes a benchmark in the mechanical automation market (precision mechanical workshop for machine tool machining of plastics, milling, turning, boring, and tooling design).

In 1960 Renato Mandelli decided to also associate his three sons, Sante Mandelli, Giancarlo Mandelli, and Umberto Mandelli. The three brothers will be included in the company's staff to develop it into a group that can cross national borders and becomes operational on an international scale. The company in that year becomes Mandelli S.n.c and focuses on the production of machine tools, POSITIV, MEDAL, THEMA, and the construction of the first core of the current plant.

In 1967, at the Milan Fair, Giancarlo, Sante, and Umberto brought to the market the first numerically controlled machine, which was later called a “revolutionary” product because it coupled the mechanical part with the first elementary computerized brain.

Giancarlo Mandelli stated during the days of the exposition, “In 1967 we started from where the most advanced companies had arrived. Even then, our first strategic choice was to focus on research by regularly investing a significant share of revenues in it. This year, for example, we will commit 12 percent of our revenues to this area, which is well above average.”

Expansion 
In the following years, Mandelli began manufacturing with a new 5-axis horizontal machining center concept, what would later be called the SPARK Line. The SPARK X becomes the new production model because it is the first time three linear axes of motion are used on one side and the workpiece on the other. The company quickly achieves a significant knowledge base, allowing it to move from a mechanical company to a mechatronics company. The three brothers realize after commissioning market research that the industry of the future is written in machine tools, namely the production of tools needed to build cars, tractors, and washing machines. So, they also begin to produce everything in-house, designing all the electronics needed for their machines directly in their factory.

The new way of conceiving the industrialization of the company allows passes through three important achievements that they reached at the time:
 The same line can be used to manufacture different parts of the same product family
 Conversion of an FMS from one type of production to an entirely different one is basic;
 It is possible to vary production rates at one's convenience.

Customers 
Results that enabled them to reach several important customers, such as IBM, Rolls-Royce, Iveco, Volvo, John Deere, Caterpillar, and Ferrari.

In 1984, the company transferred a license to the Japanese Amada to produce two machines designed entirely in Italy. Also in the same year, a second plant was added in Avellino, called Mandelli 2.

Revenues rise from 39 billion Italian Lire in 1983, to 57 billion in 1984, rising to 65 billion in 1985 and 90 billion in 1986. 120 billion is exceeded in 1987, with profits between 5 and 6 billion. Turnover for the year 1988 is estimated at 140 billion.

In those years, they established a partnership with IBM, a collaboration that gave birth to Spring (Studies and Projects for Automatic Factory Engineering). A research center is made available not only to the company but also to other companies engaged in the machine tool industry by providing designs, models, and even prototypes of machines or systems.

In 1989, Mandelli Sistemi goes public on the Milan Stock Exchange's Piazza Affari list.

Crisis 
In the early 1990s, however, the company, listed at the time on the Milan Stock Exchange, entered a crisis that led it to face financial collapse in 1995. It spends the next two years under controlled administration, with CEO Andrea Mattarelli taking over in January 1996 and for the next two years. The company, after bankruptcy the next two years under controlled administration, was taken over by five investors and led by Victor Uckmar, who oversaw the restructuring and the revitalization: investment bank M.M. Warburg & co., ⁣ Sitindustrie (robotic automation), Pllb electronics, Finatan S.p.A. (industrial holding company), and Mattarelli, all of whom are present in the capital with a stake of about 20 percent.

The story of the bankruptcy and the charges and subsequent convictions that were brought and upheld by the European Court of Human Rights in Strasbourg, against members of the Mandelli family, was told in the book: Institutes Discredit, written by Angelo Santoro and Biagio Riccio.

The 2000s 
The company was acquired in 2000 by the Riello Sistemi Group with a commitment to re-grow, new processes that were leaner and on the innovation that marked it before the crisis.

In 2021, after more than two decades of management and during the pandemic, the company seriously challenged the brand's strength due to the losses of the Boeing and Airbus businesses. The management decided to sell the Allied Group, managed by Valter Alberici, Group President and Vice President of Confindustria Piacenza, through an auction. The new owners pledged to keep the jobs of all 49 employees, giving continuity to the installed machines-a priority issue from the beginning, to secure the company's.

Products 
In 1965 the first machine tools were built: POSITIV, MEDAL, and THEMA, and the first core of the current factory were established; that year also saw the construction of the first machine with basic features for a machining center, EGO, and the workshop became a joint-stock company.

In 1970, the new REGENT line, a modular generation that can be integrated into more complex systems, was introduced, and at the same time, the first experiences with machining on special materials typical of the aviation industry such as Titanium began.

In 1975, the first flexible production and business development system called “FMS” is implemented.

In 1980, the first numerically controlled product called Plasma was developed in the new machining center called QUASAR, the work of well-known architects Ettore Sottsass and Matteo Thun

References 

Italian companies established in 1932
Privately held companies of Italy